Ridgefield High School may refer to:
Ridgefield High School (Ridgefield, Connecticut), Ridgefield, Connecticut
Ridgefield Memorial High School, Ridgefield, New Jersey
Ridgefield High School (Ridgefield, Washington), Ridgefield, Washington